Bilovodsk Raion was a raion (district) in Luhansk Oblast in eastern Ukraine. The administrative center of the raion was the urban-type settlement of Bilovodsk. The raion was abolished on 18 July 2020 as part of the administrative reform of Ukraine, which reduced the number of raions of Luhansk Oblast to eight, of which only four were controlled by the government.

Demographics 
As of the 2001 Ukrainian census:

Ethnicity
 Ukrainians: 87.8%
 Russians: 11.2%
 Belarusians: 0.3%

References

Former raions of Luhansk Oblast
1923 establishments in the Soviet Union
Ukrainian raions abolished during the 2020 administrative reform